Tell Tamer (or Til Temir) also known as Tal Tamr or Tal Tamir, is a town in western al-Hasakah Governorate, northeastern Syria. It is the administrative center of the Tell Tamer Subdistrict consisting of 13 municipalities.

Originally built and inhabited by Assyrians of the Upper Tyari tribe in the late 1930s, the town is now predominantly populated by Kurds and Arabs, with Assyrians remaining a substantial minority of about 20%. At the 2004 census, Tell Tamer had a population of 7,285.

Located on the Khabur River at an intersection between the M4 Highway (Aleppo–Mosul) and the major road between al-Hasakah and Diyarbakır (Turkey), the town is a transport hub of major importance.

Etymology 
The name of the town, "Tell Tamer", is derived from the Arabic and Aramaic words "tell/tella", both meaning "hill", and "tamer/tamra", both meaning "date". The name of the town therefore means "Hill of Dates".

Geography 
In the Khabur Valley of Upper Mesopotamia, Tell Tamer is situated on the left (eastern) bank of Khabur River, just south of the small Zirgan River's estuary. About  to the east, the landscape ascends to the Ard al-Shaykh volcanic basalt plateau.

The intersection with the M4 highway (Aleppo–Mosul) and the nearby river crossing make Tell Tamer an essential transport hub.

History 
It was settled in the 1930s by Iraqi Assyrian refugees fleeing the Simele massacre in Iraq, who moved to French controlled Syria and settled in a 25 km stretch of the Khabur River in 35 settlements.

Civil War 
An Assyrian exodus from the town began in November 2012, when Free Syrian Army soldiers threatened to invade the town. The exodus further continued when the Islamic State took control of nearby roads just outside the town.

In October 2013, four Assyrians were stopped while driving in a car and kidnapped by IS.

According to the Syriac International News Agency, in May 2014, ISIL attacked an Assyrian village, which prompted the Assyrians to call the Kurdish YPG to help protect them.

Since IS militants captured the city of Raqqa, some Assyrians from there and from Al-Thawrah fled to Tell Tamer as refugees. However, more than 500 Assyrian families have also fled the town. Many Assyrians from the town emigrated mainly to the United States, Europe and Canada.

In February 2015 the town was taken by the Islamic State militia, resulting in the abduction of about 90 residents. during the al-Hasakah offensive. Several thousand residents fled the city, mostly to the city of al-Hasakah.

On 23 February 2015, IS kidnapped around 220 Assyrians from villages surrounding Tell Tamer, and by 26 February, that number had increased to 350. On 1 March, IS released 19 of the kidnapped Assyrians. On 24 March 5 more Assyrian hostages were released, raising the number of released Assyrian hostages to 24.

On 11 December 2015, three truck bombs killed 60 people and injured more than 80.

On 14 October 2019, the Syrian army deployed to Tell Tamer after the Syrian Government reached an agreement with the SDF.

Demographics 
Its original inhabitants are Assyrians from the Upper Tyari tribe, who came to the area from Hakkari region in Turkey via Iraq. As late as the 1960s, they still comprised virtually the entire population of the town. The majority of the town's modern population is composed of Arabs and Kurds, while local Assyrian leaders in the 1990s estimated their own community's presence in the town to be around 20%.

Historical population estimates are as follows: 1,244 (1936); 1,250 (1960); 2,994 (1981); 5,030 (1993); 5,216 (1994); 5,405 (1995).

The pre-war scholarly estimates actually placed the total number of Assyrians belonging to the Assyrian Church of the East living all over of Syria at around 30,000 individuals, with between 15,000 and 20,000 (i.e., 2/3, at most) of them living along the Khabur.

Religion 
The Assyrian "Church of Our Lady", located in the Old Town, at a prominent place near the actual Tell (hill), serves as the center of the Assyrian community. In the early 1980s the original church built of mud-brick in the 1930s was broken down and replaced by a new Italianate-style building. A large green-domed brick mosque built in the 1970s serves the growing Muslim community just to the south of the town center.

Notable people 
Adwar Mousa, prominent Assyrian singer-songwriter.
Juliana Jendo, prominent Assyrian singer.
Omar Souleyman, prominent Arab singer.

See also 

List of Assyrian settlements

References

Literature

External links 
http://www.aina.org/articles/asotk.pdf
http://www.aina.org/maps/khaburmap.htm

Assyrian communities in Syria
Kidnapping in Syria
Upper Mesopotamia